The  singles Tournament at the 2007 Banka Koper Slovenia Open took place between September 17 and September 23 on outdoor hard courts in Portorož, Slovenia. Tatiana Golovin won the title, defeating Katarina Srebotnik in the final.

Seeds

Draw

Finals

Top half

Bottom half

References
 Main Draw

2007 Singles
Banka Koper Slovenia Open - Singles